This is a list of participants, associates and  helpers of, and certain infiltrators (such as Heinz Pannwitz) into, the Red Orchestra as it was known in Germany. Red Orchestra was the name given by the Abwehr to members of the German resistance to Nazism and anti-Nazi resistance movements in Allied or occupied countries during World War II. Many of the people on this list were arrested by the Abwehr or Gestapo. They were tried at the Nazi Imperial War Court before being executed either by hanging or guillotine, unless otherwise indicated. As the SS-Sonderkommando also took action against Soviet espionage networks within Switzerland, people who worked there are also included here.

Group organisational diagrams
The following meticulously researched hierarchy diagrams were created by the Joint security service that consisted of the MI6 and the CIA between 1945 and 31 December 1949.

Key
 If a person was associated with a group, then they are shaded.
 If they joined one group and left to join another, perhaps because the first group was disrupted, then the second group is detailed in notes and they are shaded based on the first group.
 If they worked for Soviet intelligence and built a group, then they are shaded as Soviet intelligence agents.

A

B

C

D

E

F

G

H

I

J

K

L

M

N

O

P

R

S

T

U

V

W

Y
No entries.

Z

Literature

References

Red Orchestra (espionage)